The 2014–15 season was Olympique Lyonnais's 65th professional season since its creation in 1950. The club competed in Ligue 1, finishing second, the Coupe de France, and the Coupe de la Ligue.

Players

First team squad

French teams are limited to four players without EU citizenship. Hence, the squad list includes only the principal nationality of each player; several non-European players on the squad have dual citizenship with an EU country. Also, players from the ACP countries—countries in Africa, the Caribbean, and the Pacific that are signatories to the Cotonou Agreement—are not counted against non-EU quotas due to the Kolpak ruling.

As of 3 February 2015

]

Transfers

In

Out

Pre-season and friendlies

Competitions

Ligue 1

League table

Results summary

Results by round

Matches

Coupe de France

Coupe de la Ligue

UEFA Europa League

Third qualifying round

Play-off round

Statistics

Appearances and goals

|-
! colspan=14 style=background:#dcdcdc; text-align:center| Goalkeepers

|-
! colspan=14 style=background:#dcdcdc; text-align:center| Defenders

|-
! colspan=14 style=background:#dcdcdc; text-align:center| Midfielders

|-
! colspan=14 style=background:#dcdcdc; text-align:center| Forwards

|-

References

Olympique Lyonnais seasons
Lyon